Roman Leonidovich Starchenko (born May 12, 1986) is a Kazakhstani professional ice hockey centre who currently plays for HC Spartak Moscow of the Kontinental Hockey League (KHL).

Playing career
Like most Kazakhstani professionals, Starchenko has played in the Torpedo Ust-Kamenogorsk system. He spent 2003-04 with Barys Astana in the Kazakhstan Hockey Championship, scoring 11 goals in his first season of senior pro hockey, and then played the next four seasons with Kazzinc-Torpedo. He had a 14-goal, 25-point season in 2006-07, and was signed by Barys Astana in 2008. He finished his first KHL season with 5 goals and 16 points.

Following 14 seasons in the KHL playing exclusively within Barys, Starchenko left the club as a free agent and was signed to a one-year contract to join Russian club, HC Spartak Moscow, for the 2022–23 season on 18 July 2022.

Career statistics

Regular season and playoffs

International

References

External links

1986 births
Living people
Asian Games gold medalists for Kazakhstan
Medalists at the 2011 Asian Winter Games
Asian Games medalists in ice hockey
Barys Nur-Sultan players
Kazakhstani ice hockey centres
Kazzinc-Torpedo players
Ice hockey players at the 2011 Asian Winter Games
Sportspeople from Oskemen
HC Spartak Moscow players